Songs in Ordinary Time is the 1995 novel by Mary McGarry Morris, and was chosen as an Oprah's Book Club selection in June 1997.

Plot introduction
A novel set in a small town in Vermont in 1960 offers the story of lonely and vulnerable Marie Fermoyle, her three children, and a dangerous con man.

Movie
A made-for-television film adaptation, starring Sissy Spacek and Beau Bridges was released in 2000. The film was directed by Rod Holcomb, screenplay written by Malcolm Macrury, with music by Anthony Marinelli.

References

1995 novels
Novels set in Vermont
Fiction set in 1960